Johannes "Jo" Hermann Bruno Anton Weil (born 29 August 1977) is a German actor and television host, best known for his portrayals of Oliver Sabel on the long-running German serial Verbotene Liebe and titular bodyguard, Frank Farmer, in multiple productions of The Bodyguard stage musical, in Austria, Germany, and Switzerland.

In addition, Weil's career includes multiple leading and featured guest roles in both English- and German-language television, film, and stage productions since 1996, the release of two music singles, and stints as a host/moderator for German television and online features.

Early life and education
Weil is the son of a German business owner and a physiotherapist. He grew up in Fulda, West Germany, with a brother, Michael, who is three years younger and a lawyer, in Petersberg and finishing his high school education at the Freiherr-vom-Stein-Schule. After high school and community service, he attended drama school in Cologne and took private acting and singing lessons. From 1998 to 2006, he continued his education via stage workshops at the Arturo Drama School.

Career

Weil has primarily worked as an actor, starring in German- and English-language television and stage productions. He has also worked as a model, fronting a series of popular calendars), television host/moderator, and voiceover artist.

Film

Television

In 2000, Weil started played a young bisexual waiter "Oliver Sabel", a lead role in the evening drama series Verbotene Liebe ('Forbidden Love'). Oliver later falls in love with his roommate Christian Mann (played by Thore Schölermann), and with whom he has formed one of the leading couples of the series since 2007. The impact of Christian and Oliver's story has spread outside Germany via the Internet (including YouTube), such as Brazil, the United States, Canada, Spain, China, and others countries, even though the series is not broadcast outside of German-speaking countries. They were also invited to attend Whistler in Canada for the Winterpride. He attended fashion shows and was in the jury for the election of the "Mr. Gay World ". 
From November 2007, Weil, after a five-year break, returned to the role of 'Oliver'. On September 2010, 'Oliver' marries 'Christian' in a church wedding. In 2011, he and co-star Thore Schölermann, won 'most beautiful lovers' award at the German Soap Awards and he won the 'Fan Price Male' award. He won another soap award, on 26 October 2012, he won 'Fan Prize Male' again at the Soap Award in Berlin, Germany. In August 2012, due to other commitments Thore Schölermann left the show, breaking up "Chrolli", as the couple was called by fans. He then left the show in February 2015.

Stage
 Glück auf (2000)
 Gespenster (2004–2005)
 Bei Verlobung Mord (2006–2007)
 Ganze Kerle (Tough Guys) (2007–2009)
 Landeier  (2013)
 Zauberhafte Zeiten (2015)
 Bodyguard - The Musical Vienna production (2018)
 Bodyguard - The Musical German-speaking tour (2019)

Music
After he was unsuccessful with his 2002 released first single One More Try, a cover version of the same title by Timmy T from 1991. He presented on 31 May 2014, his second single Explosiv in the ARD show The Summerfest am See ('The Summer Festival on the lake'). The song is again a cover version, this time by Michael Morgan, who already released the song in 2002.

Hosting and reality television
In 2010, he participated in the cooking show The Perfect Celebrity Dinner by RTL Living's section channel.

In 2015, he wanted to set the world record in speed kissing in Cologne, as there were not enough women to beat the previous record set by Florian Silbereisen. 118 women missed a smooch within 60 seconds, but he did get to kiss 63 women in 30 seconds, impressing the record adjudicators.

Since August 2016. Weil presents format Lifestyle with Jo Weil, on the online channel Wirtschaft TV. The first season was in Palma recorded [2] . Guests included were Daniela Katzenberger, Thomas Rath (fashion designer), Kate Bosworth, Sıla Şahin, Kristina Bach and Hilary Swank.

In 2017, Weil participated with Mirja du Mont as a dance partner on the program Dance Dance Dance. From autumn 2018, he took over the role of Frank Farmer in The Bodyguard at the Ronacher Theatre in Vienna.

In 2009, Weil also began writing a featured column in the English lifestyle magazine reFRESH.

Activism
Weil has volunteered as a celebrity ambassador for the "Aidshilfe Köln", including the "Run of Colors", and has supported the "Puzzle of the Wishes" tour, which fulfills children's wishes nationwide and the "Aktion Tagwerk" campaign.

Personal life
Weil lives in Cologne, Germany, when not working elsewhere. Following 21 years of declining to comment on his personal life, Weil came out as gay in an interview with Bunte Magazine in April 2020, revealing he has been in a long term relationship for more than a decade.

References

External links 

 Official site
 

1977 births
Living people
German male television actors
German male soap opera actors
Actors from Frankfurt
German male stage actors
German gay actors
German LGBT broadcasters
Television people from Frankfurt